The Wenzhou–Fuzhou railway, also known as the Wenfu railway, is a dual-track, electrified, high-speed rail line running between Wenzhou in Zhejiang and Fuzhou, the capital of Fujian. Construction began in August 2005, and the line opened to freight traffic on July 1, 2009. Passenger service began on September 28, 2009. Trains running on the line reach top speeds of 250 kilometres per hour, and the shortest trip between Wenzhou and Fuzhou takes 1.5 hours. The line required investment of  ¥12.66 billion. To improve connections between Fuzhou and Zhejiang, the government is proposing to build a faster parallel passenger dedicated line called the Wenzhou–Fuzhou high-speed railway.

Route
Bridges and tunnels account for over 78% of the line's total length. Major cities along route include Rui'an, Cangnan, Fuding, Ningde, Luoyuan and Lianjiang.

History
The Wenzhou–Fuzhou railway is the first railway to connect the two neighboring provinces.  Most high-speed rail lines in China follow the routes of older conventional railroads, but there were no railways on the southeast coast prior to the building of high-speed rail.  Historically, the southeast coastal region relied on maritime transportation, and rugged terrain made railway construction more expensive.  In the first half of the 20th century, warfare and political instability delayed railway construction.  During the Cold War, the southeast coast faced the threat of invasion from Republic of China on Taiwan and all railways were built inland.  Only when political tensions across the Taiwan Strait eased in the late 1990s did planning of the Wenzhou–Fuzhou railway take place.
In October 2002, the project was initially approved by the National Development and Reform Commission as a single-track railway at the  standard.  The project was then upgraded to a double-track  standard and received State Council approval in 2004.  Construction on an experimental basis began in December 2004 and on a full-scale in August 2005.  Track-laying was completed in April 2009.  Freight and passenger service began, respectively on July 1 and September 28, 2009.

Rail connections
Wenzhou:Ningbo–Taizhou–Wenzhou railway, Jinhua–Wenzhou railway
Fuzhou: Fuzhou–Xiamen railway, Nanping–Fuzhou railway, Xiangtang–Putian railway
Ningde: Quzhou–Ningde railway

See also

 List of railways in China

References

Railway lines in China
Rail transport in Zhejiang
Rail transport in Fujian